Johann Philipp Murray (30 July 1726 – 12 January 1776) was a German historian who was mainly interested in early Nordic studies and the relations between England and Scandinavia.

Biography

Johann Philipp Murray was born on 30 July 1726 in Schleswig.
He was the oldest son of the Prussian-born preacher and theologian Andreas Murray (1695 - 1771).
His brothers were the professors Johann Andreas Murray (1740-1791) and Adolph Murray (1751-1803), and the Bishop Gustaf Murray (1747-1825). 
Murray was a student in Königsberg in 1742, Uppsala in 1746 and Göttingen in 1747. 
In 1748 he became a Master of Arts at the University of Göttingen, assistant professor in 1755 and full professor in 1762. 
He died on 12 January 1776 in Göttingen.

Work

Murray was mainly interested in material from the Nordic region and the history of England during antiquity and the Middle Ages. 
For example, he wrote about runes, the history of the Nordic countries in earlier times, Nordic settlements in the British Isles and Philippa of England, the queen of Eric of Pomerania.  His writings also discussed coins, seals and watermarks.  He had an extensive correspondence with other scholars in Sweden and Germany. On the other hand, his lectures were not widely attended and his memory faded rapidly after his death.

Selected bibliography

References
Citations

Sources

1726 births
1776 deaths
18th-century German historians
German male non-fiction writers